Michael Lacey may refer to:

 Michael Lacey (mathematician) (born 1959), an American mathematician
 Michael Lacey (editor), American newspaper editor 
 Michael Pearse Lacey (1916–2014), Canadian bishop
 Mick Lacey, Irish hurler

See also
 Michael Rophino Lacy (1795–1867), Irish violinist and composer